Pontederia crassipes (formerly Eichhornia crassipes), commonly known as common water hyacinth is an aquatic plant native to South America, naturalized throughout the world, and often invasive outside its native range. It is the sole species of the subgenus Oshunae within the genus Pontederia. Anecdotally, it is known as the "terror of Bengal" due to its invasive growth tendencies.

Description

Water hyacinth is a free-floating perennial aquatic plant (or hydrophyte) native to tropical and subtropical South America. They have long, spongy, bulbous stalks. The feathery, freely hanging roots are purple-black. An erect stalk supports a single spike of 8–15 conspicuously attractive flowers, mostly lavender to pink in colour with six petals. When not in bloom, water hyacinth may be mistaken for frog's-bit (Limnobium spongia) or Amazon frogbit (Limnobium laevigatum).

One of the fastest-growing plants known, water hyacinth reproduces primarily by way of runners or stolons, which eventually form daughter plants. Each plant additionally can produce thousands of seeds each year, and these seeds can remain viable for more than 28 years. Common water hyacinths (Pontederia crassipes) are vigorous growers and mats can double in size in one to two weeks. In terms of plant count rather than size, they are said to multiply by more than a hundredfold in number, in a matter of 23 days.

In their native range, these flowers are pollinated by long-tongued bees, and they can reproduce both sexually and clonally. The invasiveness of the hyacinth is related to its ability to clone itself, and large patches are likely to all be part of the same genetic form.

Water hyacinth has three flower morphs and is termed "tristylous". The flower morphs are named for the length of their pistils - long, medium, and short. Tristylous populations are, however, limited to the native lowland South American range of water hyacinth; in the introduced range, the M-morph prevails, with the L-morph occurring occasionally and the S-morph is absent altogether. This geographical distribution of the floral morphs indicates that founder events have played a prominent role in the species' worldwide spread.

Habitat and ecology
Its habitat ranges from tropical desert to subtropical or warm, temperate desert to rainforest zones. The temperature tolerance of the water hyacinth is: 
Its minimum growth temperature is 
Its optimum growth temperature is 
Its maximum growth temperature is 
Its pH tolerance is estimated at 5.0–7.5. Water hyacinths do not grow where the average salinity is greater than 15% that of sea water (around 5 g salt per kg). In brackish water, its leaves show epinasty and chlorosis, and eventually die. Rafts of harvested water hyacinth have been floated to the sea where it is killed.

Azotobacter chroococcum, a species of nitrogen-fixing bacteria, is probably concentrated around the bases of the petioles, but the bacteria do not fix nitrogen unless the plant is suffering extreme nitrogen deficiency.

Fresh plants contain prickly crystals. This plant is reported to contain hydrogen cyanide, alkaloids, and triterpenoids, and may induce itching. Plants sprayed with 2,4-dichlorophenoxyacetic acid may accumulate lethal doses of nitrates, and other harmful elements in polluted environments.

Invasive species 
Water hyacinth grows and reproduces quickly, so it can cover large portions of ponds and lakes. Particularly vulnerable are bodies of water that have already been affected by human activities, such as artificial reservoirs or eutrophied lakes that receive large amounts of nutrients. It outcompetes native aquatic plants, both floating and submerged. In 2011, Wu Fuqin et al. tracked the results of Yunnan Dianchi Lake and also showed that water hyacinth could affect the photosynthesis of phytoplankton, submerged plants, and algae by water environment quality and inhibit their growth. The decay process depletes dissolved oxygen in the water, often killing fish.

Water hyacinth can absorb a large amount of harmful heavy metals and other substances. After death, it rots and sinks to the bottom of the water, causing secondary pollution to the water body, destroying the natural water quality, and may even affect the quality of residents' drinking water in severe cases. Water where water hyacinth grows heavily is often a breeding place for disease vectors (e.g. mosquitoes and snails) and harmful pathogens, posing a potential threat to the health of local residents. On the other hand, water hyacinth can also provide a food source for goldfish, keep water clean and help to provide oxygen.

The invasion of water hyacinth also has socioeconomic consequences. Since water hyacinth is comprised up of 95% water, its evapotranspiration rate is high. As such, small lakes that have been covered with the species can dry out and leave communities without adequate water or food supply. In some areas, dense mats of water hyacinth prevent the use of a waterway, leading to the loss of transportation (both human and cargo), as well as a loss of fishing possibilities. Large sums of money are allocated to the removal of water hyacinth from the water bodies as well as figuring out how to destroy the remains harvested. Harvesting water hyacinth mechanically requires considerable effort. A million tons of fresh biomass would require 75 trucks with a capacity of 40 m3, per day, for 365 days to get rid of it. The water hyacinth would then be transferred to a dumping site and allowed to decompose, which releases CO2, CH4, and nitrogen oxides, which would all negatively impact the air quality and contribute to global warming.

Water hyacinth has been widely introduced in North America, Europe, Asia, Australia, Africa, and New Zealand. In many areas, it has become an important and pernicious invasive species. In New Zealand, it is listed on the National Pest Plant Accord, which prevents it from being propagated, distributed, or sold. In large water areas such as Louisiana, the Kerala Backwaters in India, Tonlé Sap in Cambodia, and Lake Victoria, it has become a serious pest. The common water hyacinth has become an invasive plant species on Lake Victoria in Africa after it was introduced into the area in the 1980s.

United States

Introduction into the U.S.

Various accounts are given as to how the water hyacinth was introduced to the United States.

The claim that the water hyacinth was introduced to the U.S. in 1884 at the World's Fair in New Orleans, also known as the World Cotton Centennial, has been characterized as the "first authentic account", as well as "local legend".

At some time,  versions of the "legend" asserted that the plants had been given away as a gift by a Japanese delegation at the fair. This claim is absent in a pertinent article published in a military engineer's trade journal dating to 1940, but appears in a piece penned in 1941 by the director of the wildlife and fisheries division at the Louisiana Department of Conservation, where the author writes, "the Japanese government maintained a Japanese building" at the fair, and the "Japanese staff imported from Venezuela considerable numbers of water hyacinth, which were given away as souvenirs". The claim has been repeated by later writers, with various shifts in the details. Thus National Academy of Sciences fellow Noel D. Vietmeyer (1975) wrote, "Japanese entrepreneurs" introduced the plant into the U.S., and the plants had been "collected from the Orinoco River in Venezuela", and the claim was echoed along the same gist by a pair of NASA researchers, who asserted that the souvenir plants were carelessly dumped in various waterways. Canadian biologist Spencer C. H. Barrett (2004) meanwhile favored the theory they were first cultivated in garden ponds, after which they multiplied and escaped to the environs. The account gains a different detail as told by children's story-teller Carole Marsh (1992), who says "Japan gave away water hyacinth seeds" during the exposition, and another Southern raconteur, Gaspar J. "Buddy" Stall (1998) assured his readership that the Japanese gave each family a package of those seeds.

One paper has also inquired into the role which catalog sales of seeds and plants may have played in the dissemination of invasive plants. By 1895, it was offered by seed purveyors in the states of New Jersey, New York, California, and Florida.

The Harper's Weekly magazine (1895) printed an anecdotal account stating that a certain man from New Orleans collected and brought home water hyacinths from Colombia, around 1892, and the plant proliferated in a matter of 2 years.

Infestation and control in the Southeast 

As the hyacinths multiply into mats, they eliminate the presence of fish, and choke waterways for boating and shipping. This effect was well taking hold in the state of Louisiana by the turn of the 20th century.

The plant invaded Florida in 1890, and an estimated 50 kg/m2 of the plant mass choked Florida's waterways. The clogging of the St. Johns River was posing a serious threat, and in 1897 the government dispatched a task force of the United States Army Corps of Engineers to solve the water hyacinth problem plaguing the Gulf states such as Florida and Louisiana.

Thus, in the early 20th century, the U.S. War Department (i.e., the Army Corps of Engineers) tested various means of eradicating the plants, including the jet-streaming of steam and hot water, application of various strong acids, and application of petroleum followed by incineration. Spraying with saturated salt solution (but not dilute solutions) effectively killed the plants; unfortunately this was considered prohibitively expensive, and the engineers selected Harvesta brand herbicide, whose active ingredient was arsenic acid, as the optimal cost-effective tool for eradication. This herbicide was used until 1905, when it was substituted with a different, white arsenic-based compound. An engineer charged with the spraying did not think the poison to be a matter of concern, stating that the crew of the spraying boat would routinely catch fish from their working areas and consume them. However, spraying had little hope of completely eradicating the water hyacinth, due to the vastness of escaped colonies and the inaccessibility of some of the infested areas, and the engineer suggested that some biological means of control may be needed. 

In 1910, a bold solution was put forth by the New Foods Society. Their plan was to import and release hippopotamus from Africa into the rivers and bayous of Louisiana. The hippopotamus would then eat the water hyacinth and also produce meat to solve another serious problem at the time, the American meat crisis.

Known as the American Hippo Bill, H.R. 23621 was introduced by Louisiana Congressman Robert Broussard and debated by the Agricultural Committee of the U.S. House of Representatives. The chief collaborators in the New Foods Society and proponents of Broussard's bill were Major Frederick Russell Burnham, the celebrated American Scout, and Captain Fritz Duquesne, a South African Scout who later became a notorious spy for Germany. Presenting before the Agricultural Committee, Burnham made the point that none of the animals that Americans ate (chickens, pigs, cattle, sheep, or lambs) were native to the U.S. and had all been imported by European settlers centuries before, so Americans should not hesitate to introduce hippopotamus and other large animals into the American diet. Duquesne, who was born and raised in South Africa, further noted that European settlers on that continent commonly included hippopotamus, ostrich, antelope, and other African wildlife in their diets and suffered no ill effects. The American Hippo Bill fell one vote short of passage.

Water hyacinths have also been introduced into waters inhabited by manatees in Florida, for the purpose of bioremediation (cf. §Phytoremediation below) of the waters that have become contaminated and fallen victim to algal blooming. The manatees include the water hyacinth in their diet, but it may not be the food of first choice for them.

Legality of sale and shipment in the United States
In 1956, E. crassipes was banned for sale or shipment in the United States, subject to a fine and/or imprisonment. This law was repealed by HR133 [116th Congress (2019-2020)] on 12/27/2020.

Africa 

The water hyacinth may have been introduced into Egypt in the late 18th to early 19th century during Muhammad Ali of Egypt's era, but was not recognized as an invasive threat until 1879. The invasion into Egypt is dated between 1879 and 1892 by Brij Gopal. 

The plant (Afrikaans: waterhiasint) arguably invaded South Africa in 1910, although earlier dates have been claimed. A waterbody extensively threatened by water hyacinth is the Hartebeespoort Dam near Brits in North West Province.

The plant was introduced by Belgian colonists to Rwanda to beautify their holdings. It then advanced by natural means to Lake Victoria, where it was first sighted in 1988. There, without any natural enemies, it has become an ecological plague, suffocating the lake, diminishing the fish reservoir, and hurting the local economies. It impedes access to Kisumu and other harbors.

The water hyacinth has also appeared in Ethiopia, where it was first reported in 1965 at the Koka Reservoir and in the Awash River, where the Ethiopian Electric Light and Power Authority has managed to bring it under moderate control at considerable cost of human labor. Other infestations in Ethiopia include many bodies of water in the Gambela Region, the Blue Nile from Lake Tana into Sudan, and Lake Ellen near Alem Tena. By 2018, it has become a serious problem on Lake Tana in Ethiopia.

The water hyacinth is also present on the Shire River in the Liwonde National Park in Malawi.

Asia

Water hyacinth was introduced to North America in 1884 and later to Asia, Africa, and Australia. Since no natural enemies occur in the new location, it can multiply quickly and cause disaster.

The water hyacinth was introduced to Bengal, India, because of its beautiful flowers and shapes of leaves, but turned out to be an invasive weed, draining oxygen from the water bodies and resulting in devastation of fish stocks. The water hyacinth was referred to as the "(beautiful) blue devil" in Bengal, and "Bengal terror" elsewhere in India; it was called "German weed" (Bengali: Germani pana) in Bangladesh out of belief the German Kaiser submarine mission was involved in introducing them at the outbreak of World War I; and called "Japanese trouble" in Sri Lanka, due to the rumor that the British had planted them to entice Japanese aircraft to land on the insecure pads.

In Bangladesh, projects have begun to use water hyacinth for the construction of floating vegetable gardens.

Water hyacinth has also invaded the Tonlé Sap Lake in Cambodia. An Osmose project in Cambodia is trying to fight it by having local people make baskets from it.

The plant entered Japan in 1884 for horticultural appreciation, according to conventional wisdom, but a researcher devoted to the study of the plant has discovered that ukiyo-e artist Utagawa Kunisada (or Utagawa Toyokuni III, d. 1865) produced a wood-block print featuring the water hyacinth, goldfish, and beautiful women, dated to 1855. The plant is floated on the water surface of filled (glassware) fishbowls, or glazed earthenware waterlily pots (hibachi pots serving as substitute).

In the 1930s, water hyacinth was introduced into China as a feed, ornamental plant, and sewage-control plant, and it was widely planted in the south as an animal feed. Beginning in the 1980s, with the rapid development of China's inland industry, the eutrophication of inland waters has intensified. With the help of its efficient asexual reproduction and environmental adaptation mechanisms, water hyacinth has begun to spread widely in the river basin. The hyacinths blocked the river and hindered the internal water traffic. For example, many waterways in Zhejiang and other provinces were blocked by the rapidly growing water hyacinth. In addition, a large number of water hyacinths floating in the water will block sunlight from entering the water, and its decay consumes dissolved oxygen in the water, pollutes the water quality, and can kill other aquatic plants. The outbreak of water hyacinth has seriously affected the biodiversity of the local ecosystem and threatened the production, life, and health of community residents.

In Iraq, water hyacinth, which was imported in the 1990s as a decorative plant, caused major problems for water-supply systems and fishermen at the Euphrates.

Europe
In 2016, the European Union banned any sales of the water hyacinth in the EU. The species features on the list of Invasive Alien Species of Union Concern. This means that not only the sales but also importation, cultivation, or intentional release into the environment are forbidden in the whole of the European Union.

Oceania 
In Papua New Guinea, water hyacinth blocked sunlight to other aquatic organisms, created habitat for malaria-carrying mosquitoes, clogged waterways to the point that boats could not get through, and reduced the quality of water for purposes such as cooking, washing, and drinking. People have lost income or even died due to being unable to travel to get food or medical care, or due to diseases from contaminated water or mosquitoes.

Control
Control depends on the specific conditions of each affected location such as the extent of water hyacinth infestation, regional climate, and proximity to human and wildlife.

Chemical control 
Chemical control is the least used of the three controls of water hyacinth, because of its long-term effects on the environment and human health. The use of herbicides requires strict approval from governmental protection agencies and skilled technicians to handle and spray the affected areas. The use of chemical herbicides is only used in case of severe infiltration of water hyacinth. However, the most successful use of herbicides is when it is used for smaller areas of infestation, because in larger areas, more mats of water hyacinths are likely to survive the herbicides and can fragment to further propagate a large area of water hyacinth mats. In addition, it is more cost-effective and less laborious than mechanical control, yet it can lead to environmental effects, as it can penetrate into the ground water system and can affect not only the hydrological cycle within an ecosystem, but also negatively affect the local water system and human health. Also of note, the use of herbicides is not strictly selective of water hyacinths; keystone species and vital organisms such as microalgae can perish from the toxins and can disrupt fragile food webs.

The chemical regulation of water hyacinths can be done using common herbicides such as 2,4-D, glyphosate, and diquat. The herbicides are sprayed on the water hyacinth leaves and leads to direct changes to the physiology of the plant. The use of the herbicide known as 2,4-D leads to the death of water hyacinth through inhibition of cell growth of new tissue and cellular apoptosis. Almost a two-week period may be needed before mats of water hyacinth are destroyed with 2, 4-D. Between  of water hyacinth and alligator weed are treated annually in Louisiana.

The herbicide known as diquat is a liquid bromide salt that can rapidly penetrate the leaves of the water hyacinth and lead to immediate inactivity of plant cells and cellular processes. The herbicide glyphosate has a lower toxicity than the other herbicides, so takes longer for the water hyacinth mats to be destroyed (about three weeks). The symptoms include steady wilting of the plants and a yellow discoloration of the plant leaves that eventually leads to plant decay.

Physical control 
Physical control is performed by land-based machines, such as bucket cranes, draglines, or boom, or by water-based machinery such as aquatic weed harvesters, dredges, or vegetation shredder. Mechanical removal is seen as the best short-term solution to the proliferation of the plant. It is, however, costly and requires the use of both land and water vehicles, but many years were needed for the lake to become in poor condition, and reclamation will be a continual process.

It can have an annual cost from $6 million to $20 million and is only considered a short-term solution to a long-term problem. Another disadvantage with mechanical harvesting is that it can lead to further fragmentation of water hyacinths when the plants are broken up by spinning cutters of the plant-harvesting machinery. The fragments of water hyacinth that are left behind in the water can easily reproduce asexually and cause another infestation.

Transportation and disposal of the harvested water hyacinth is a challenge, though, because the vegetation is heavy in weight. The harvested water hyacinth can pose a health risk to humans because of the plant's propensity for absorbing contaminants, and it is considered toxic to humans. Furthermore, the practice of mechanical harvesting is not effective in large-scale infestations, because this aquatic invasive species grows much more rapidly than it can be eliminated. Only  of water hyacinth can be mechanically harvested daily because of the vast amounts in the environment. Therefore, the process is very time-intensive.

Biological control 
As chemical and mechanical removals are often too expensive, polluting, and ineffective, researchers have turned to biological control agents to deal with water hyacinth. The effort began in the 1970s, when USDA researchers released into the United States three species of weevils known to feed on water hyacinth, Neochetina bruchi, N. eichhorniae, and the water hyacinth borer Sameodes albiguttalis. The weevil species were introduced into the Gulf Coast states, such as Louisiana, Texas, and Florida, where thousands of acres were infested by water hyacinth. A decade later, a decrease was found in water hyacinth mats by as much as 33%, but because the lifecycle of the weevils is 90 days, the use of biological predation to efficiently suppress water hyacinth growth is limited. These organisms regulate water hyacinth by limiting its size,  vegetative propagation, and seed production. They also carry microorganisms that can be pathological to the water hyacinth. These weevils eat stem tissue, which results in a loss of buoyancy for the plant, which will eventually sink. Although meeting with limited success, the weevils have since been released in many other countries. However, the most effective control method remains the control of excessive nutrients and prevention of the spread of this species.

In May 2010, the USDA's Agricultural Research Service released Megamelus scutellaris as an additional biological control insect for the invasive water hyacinth species. M. scutellaris is a small planthopper insect native to Argentina. Researchers have been studying the effects of the biological control agent in extensive host-range studies since 2006 and concluded that the insect is highly host-specific and will not pose a threat to any other plant population other than the targeted water hyacinth. Researchers also hope that this biological control will be more resilient than existing biological controls and the herbicides that are already in place to combat the invasive water hyacinth.

Another insect being considered as a biological control agent is the semiaquatic grasshopper Cornops aquaticum. This insect is specific to the water hyacinth and its family, and besides feeding on the plant, it introduces a secondary pathogenic infestation. This grasshopper has been introduced into South Africa in controlled trials.

The introduction of manatees into waterways was reportedly successful in controlling the plant's growth in Guyana.

The Rhodes University Centre for Biological Control is rearing M. scutellaris and the water hyacinth weevils N. eichhorniae and N. bruchi en masse for biological control at dams in South Africa; of importance is the Hartbeespoort Dam.

The moth Niphograpta albiguttalis (Warren) (Lepidoptera: Pyralidae) has been introduced to North America, Africa, and Australia. Larvae of this moth bore in the stems and flower buds of water hyacinth.

Uses
Since water hyacinth is so prolific, harvesting it for various uses also serves as a means of environmental control.

Bioenergy
According to Curtis and Duke,  of dry matter can yield  of biogas, giving a heating value of  compared to pure methane (895 Btu/ft3)

Bengali farmers collect and pile up these plants to dry at the onset of the cold season; they then use the dry water hyacinths as fuel. The ashes are used as fertilizer. In India,  of dried water hyacinth yields about 50 liters ethanol and 200 kg residual fiber (7,700 Btu). Bacterial fermentation of  yields 26,500 ft3 gas (600 Btu) with 51.6% methane, 25.4% hydrogen, 22.1% carbon dioxide, and 1.2% oxygen. Gasification of  dry matter by air and steam at high temperatures gives about 40,000 ft3 (1,100 m3) natural gas (143 Btu/ft3) containing 16.6% , 4.8% , 21.7%  (carbon monoxide), 4.1% , and 52.8%  (nitrogen). The high moisture content of water hyacinth, adding so much to handling costs, tends to limit commercial ventures. A continuous, hydraulic production system could be designed, which would provide a better utilization of capital investments than in conventional agriculture, which is essentially a batch operation.

The labor involved in harvesting water hyacinth can be greatly reduced by locating collection sites and processors on impoundments that take advantage of prevailing winds. Wastewater treatment systems could also favorably be added to this operation. The harvested biomass would then be converted to ethanol, biogas, hydrogen, gaseous nitrogen, and/or fertilizer. The byproduct water can be used to irrigate nearby cropland.

Phytoremediation, waste water treatment
Water hyacinth removes arsenic from arsenic-contaminated drinking water. It may be a useful tool in removing arsenic from tube well water in Bangladesh.
 
Water hyacinth is also observed to enhance nitrification in wastewater treatment cells of living technology. Their root zones are superb micro-sites for bacterial communities.

Water hyacinth is a common fodder plant in the third world especially Africa though excessive use can be toxic. It is high in protein (nitrogen) and trace minerals and the goat feces are a good source of fertilizer as well.

Water hyacinth is reported for its efficiency to remove about 60–80% nitrogen and about 69% of potassium from water. The roots of water hyacinth were found to remove particulate matter and nitrogen in a natural shallow eutrophicated wetland.

The plant is extremely tolerant of, and has a high capacity for, the uptake of heavy metals, including cadmium, chromium, cobalt, nickel, lead, and mercury, which could make it suitable for the biocleaning of industrial wastewater.

The roots of Pontederia crassipes naturally absorb some organic compounds believed to be carcinogenic, in concentrations 10,000 times that in the surrounding water. Water hyacinths can be cultivated for waste water treatment (especially dairy waste water).

In addition to heavy metals, Pontederia crassipes can also remove other toxins, such as cyanide, which is environmentally beneficial in areas that have endured gold-mining operations.

Water hyacinth can take in and degrade ethion, a phosphorus pesticide.

Agriculture
In places where water hyacinth is invasive, overabundant, and in need of clearing away, these traits make it free for the harvesting, which makes it very useful as a source of organic matter for composting in organic farming. It is used internationally for fertilizer and as animal feed and silage for cattle, sheep, geese, pigs, and other livestock.

In Bengal, India the kachuri-pana has been used primarily for fertilizer, compost or mulch, and secondarily as fodder for livestock and fish. In Bangladesh, farmers in the southwestern region cultivate vegetables on "floating gardens" usually with a bamboo-built frame base, with dried mass of water hyacinth covered in soil as bedding. As a large portion of cultivable land goes under water for months during monsoon in this low-lying region, farmers have grown this method for many decades now. The method of this agriculture is known by many names including dhap chash and vasoman chash.

In Kenya, East Africa, it has been used experimentally as organic fertilizer, although there is controversy stemming from the high alkaline pH value of the fertilizer.

Other uses
In various places in the world, the plant is used for making furniture, handbags, baskets, rope, and household goods/interior products (lampshades, picture frames) by businesses launched by NGOs and entrepreneurs.

Woven products
American-Nigerian Achenyo Idachaba has won an award for showing how this plant can be exploited for profit as woven procuts in Nigeria.

Paper
Though a study found water hyacinths of very limited use for paper production, they are nonetheless being used for paper production on a small scale. Goswami pointed out in his article that water hyacinth has the potential to make tough and strong paper. He found that adding water hyacinth pulp to the raw material of bamboo pulp for anti-grease paper can increase the physical strength of paper.

Edibility
The plant is used as a carotene-rich table vegetable in Taiwan. Javanese sometimes cook and eat the green parts and inflorescence. Vietnamese also cook the plant and sometimes add its young leaves and flower to their salads.

Medicinal use
In Kedah (Malaysia), the flowers are used for medicating the skin of horses. The species is a "tonic".

Potential as bioherbicidal agent
Water hyacinth leaf extract has been shown to exhibit phytotoxicity against another invasive weed Mimosa pigra. The extract inhibited the germination of Mimosa pigra seeds in addition to suppressing the root growth of the seedlings. Biochemical data suggested that the inhibitory effects may be mediated by enhanced hydrogen peroxide production, inhibition of soluble peroxidase activity, and stimulation of cell wall-bound peroxidase activity in the root tissues of Mimosa pigra.

Gallery

Explanatory notes

References

Bibliography 

 
  (Complete List of References)

External links

Eichhornia crassipes

Species Profile – Water Hyacinth (Eichhornia crassipes), National Invasive Species Information Center, United States National Agricultural Library. Lists general information and resources for Water Hyacinth.
Eichhornia crassipes Israel Wildflowers and native plants
Practical uses of Water Hyacinth
IUCN Leaflet on E. crassipes in the context of Lake Tanganyika
"Water hyacinth", AquaPlant Profile

Pontederiaceae
Aquatic plants
Flora of the Amazon
Invasive plant species in Sri Lanka